Clipping is a surgical procedure performed to treat an aneurysm. If the aneurysm is intracranial, a craniotomy is performed, and afterwards an Elgiloy (Phynox) or titanium Sugita clip is affixed around the aneurysm's neck. 

Surgical clipping was introduced by Walter Dandy of the Johns Hopkins Hospital in 1937. It consists of performing a craniotomy, exposing the aneurysm, and closing the base of the aneurysm with a clip chosen specifically for the site. The surgical technique has been modified and improved over the years. Surgical clipping has a lower rate of aneurysm recurrence after treatment. Titanium Aneurysm Clips are being used to clip aneurysms and the procedure is known as aneurysm clipping.

References 

Neurosurgery